Terguride, sold under the brand name Teluron, is a serotonin receptor antagonist and dopamine receptor agonist of the ergoline family. It is approved for and used as a prolactin inhibitor in the treatment of hyperprolactinemia (high prolactin levels) in Japan. Terguride is taken by mouth.

Pharmacology

Pharmacodynamics
Terguride acts as an agonist of the dopamine D2 receptor and as an antagonist of the serotonin 5-HT2A and 5-HT2B receptors, among other actions.

As an antagonist of the 5-HT2B receptor, terguride is not associated with cardiac valvulopathy.

Research
Serotonin stimulates the proliferation of pulmonary artery smooth muscle cells, and induces fibrosis in the wall of pulmonary arteries. Together, this causes vascular remodeling and narrowing of the pulmonary arteries. These changes result in increased vascular resistance and PAH. Due to the potential anti-proliferative and anti-fibrotic activity of terguride, this potential medicine could offer the hope of achieving reversal of pulmonary artery vascular remodeling and attenuation of disease progression. In May 2008, terguride was granted orphan drug status for the treatment of pulmonary arterial hypertension.
In May 2010 Pfizer purchased worldwide rights for the drug. However, development was discontinued in 2011.

References

Alpha-1 blockers
Alpha-2 blockers
D2-receptor agonists
D2 antagonists
D3 receptor agonists
D4 antagonists
Dopamine receptor modulators
Ergolines
Orphan drugs
Prolactin inhibitors
Serotonin receptor antagonists
Serotonin receptor agonists
Ureas